The Ministry of Communication and Traffic of Bosnia and Herzegovina is the governmental department which oversees the communication and traffic of Bosnia and Herzegovina.

History
After the end of the Bosnian War in 1995, the 1996 Bosnian general election and the formation of the first post-war government in Bosnia and Herzegovina in 1997, the Ministry of Civil Affairs and Communication of Bosnia and Herzegovina began working with Spasoje Albijanić (SDS) at the head, which is the predecessor of today's Ministry of Communication and Traffic of Bosnia and Herzegovina and Ministry of Civil Affairs of Bosnia and Herzegovina.

After the 2002 Bosnian general election and the formation of the new government of Bosnia and Herzegovina between the Party of Democratic Action (SDA), the Serbian Democratic Party (SDS) and the Croatian Democratic Union of Bosnia and Herzegovina (HDZ BiH), headed by Adnan Terzić (SDA), the Ministry of Civil Affairs and Communications of Bosnia and Herzegovina was divided into the Ministry of Communication and Traffic of Bosnia and Herzegovina with Branko Dokić (PDP) becoming Minister and the Ministry of Civil Affairs of Bosnia and Herzegovina with Safet Halilović (SBiH) as Minister.

Organization
The Ministry of Communications and Traffic of Bosnia and Herzegovina consists of four sectors, one inspectorate, one directorate and one regulatory board.
Sector for Legal and Financial Affairs
Traffic Sector
Sector for traffic infrastructure, project preparation and implementation
Inspectorate
Directorate of Civil Aviation of Bosnia and Herzegovina
Regulatory Board of Rail transport in Bosnia and Herzegovina

List of ministers

Ministers of Civil Affairs and Communication (1997–2002)
Political parties:

Ministers of Communication and Traffic (2002–present)
Political parties:

References

External links

Communication and Traffic
Communicatio and Traffic
Bosnia and Herzegovina, Communication and Traffic
2002 establishments in Bosnia and Herzegovina